The canton of Albertville-1 is an administrative division of the Savoie department, southeastern France. It was created at the French canton reorganisation which came into effect in March 2015. Its seat is in Albertville.

It consists of the following communes:

Albertville (partly)
Allondaz
La Bâthie
Cevins
Esserts-Blay
Mercury
Rognaix
Saint-Paul-sur-Isère
Tours-en-Savoie

References

Cantons of Savoie